Halward is a surname. Notable people with the surname include:

Doug Halward (born 1955), Canadian ice hockey player
Leslie Halward (1905–1976), British writer of short stories and plays
Victor Halward (1897–1953), English Anglican bishop and Scouting leader in Hong Kong and China